Edward Douglass White Jr. (November 3, 1845 – May 19, 1921) was an American politician and jurist from Louisiana. White was a U.S. Supreme Court justice for 27 years, first as an associate justice from 1894 to 1910, then as the ninth chief justice from 1910 until his death in 1921. White is known for formulating the Rule of Reason standard of antitrust law.

Born in Lafourche Parish, Louisiana, White practiced law in New Orleans after graduating from the University of Louisiana. He also attended the College of the Immaculate Conception, present-day Jesuit High School in New Orleans, class of 1865. His father, Edward Douglass White Sr., was the 10th Governor of Louisiana and a Whig US Representative. White fought for the Confederacy during the Civil War and was captured in 1865. After the war, White won election to the Louisiana State Senate and served on the Louisiana Supreme Court. As a member of the Democratic Party, White represented Louisiana in the United States Senate from 1891 to 1894.

In 1894, President Grover Cleveland appointed White as an Associate Justice of the Supreme Court of the United States. In 1910, President William Howard Taft elevated him to the position of chief justice. The appointment surprised many contemporaries, as Taft was a member of the Republican Party. White served as chief justice until his death in 1921 when he was succeeded by Taft.

He sided with the Supreme Court majority in Plessy v. Ferguson, which upheld the legality of state segregation to provide "separate but equal" public facilities in the United States, despite protections of the Fourteenth Amendment to equal protection of the laws. In one of several challenges to Southern states' grandfather clauses, used to disfranchise African-American voters at the turn of the century, he wrote for a unanimous court in Guinn v. United States, which struck many of them down. He also wrote the opinion in the Selective Draft Law Cases, which upheld the constitutionality of conscription.

Early life and education
White was born on November 3, 1845, on his family's sugar plantation near Thibodaux, Louisiana, about thirty miles to the west of New Orleans. His father, Edward Douglass White Sr., was a lawyer and judge who had served as a U.S. Representative and as the governor of Louisiana. The elder White retired from Congress in 1843; his sugar plantation utilized dozens of slaves. His wife was Catherine Sidney Lee Ringgold, the daughter of influential Washington, D.C., businessman and politician Tench Ringgold; she was a descendant of the Lee family, and the future chief justice was thus distantly related to Confederate general Robert E. Lee. The couple had five children, of whom White Jr. was the youngest son. In April 1847, before his namesake son had reached his third birthday, White Sr. died. His wife remarried in 1850, wedding French-Canadian immigrant merchant Andre Brousseau. The family moved to New Orleans the subsequent year.

White attended a Jesuit school in New Orleans beginning at the age of six. Starting in 1856, he and his brother attended Mount St. Mary's College, near Emmitsburg, Maryland. White enrolled in 1858 at Georgetown University, which biographer Robert Baker Highsaw characterized as "probably the best Catholic institution of higher learning in the United States". It was distinctly Jesuit as well: university president John Early and a majority of the faculty were all members of the Society of Jesus. White's Jesuit training influenced his legal philosophy later in life, leading him to emphasize formal logical reasoning. At Georgetown, he studied the classics, the flute, and the violin; he also participated in the school's cadet corp. After the American Civil War broke out, White left Georgetown without a degree, returning home.

Confederate soldier and Ku Klux Klan Membership
White's studies at Georgetown were interrupted by the Civil War. It has been suggested  that he returned to Bayou Lafourche, enlisted in the Confederate States Army, and served under General Richard Taylor, eventually attaining the rank of lieutenant. This is questionable , as his widowed mother had remarried and was living with the rest of the family in New Orleans at the time. When he returned to Louisiana, it was probably to his primary home in New Orleans.

An apocryphal account states that White was almost captured by Union troops near Bayou Lafourche in October 1862, but that he evaded capture by hiding beneath hay in a barn. It is possible that White enlisted in the Lafourche Parish militia, as its muster rolls are not complete. There is no documentation, however, that White served in any Confederate volunteer unit or militia unit engaged in campaigns in the Lafourche area.

Another account suggests that he was assigned as an aide to Confederate General William Beall and accompanied him to Port Hudson, Louisiana, which was besieged and captured by Union troops in 1863. White's presence at Port Hudson, when he was 18 years old, is supported by a secondhand account of a postwar dinner conversation he had with Senator Knute Nelson of Minnesota, a Union veteran of Port Hudson, and another recounted by Admiral George Dewey (then a Federal naval officer at Port Hudson), in both of which White referred to being part of the besieged forces. But White's name does not appear on any list of prisoners captured at Port Hudson. According to another account of questionable reliability, White was supposedly sent to a Mississippi prisoner of war camp. As practically all Confederate soldiers of enlisted rank of the Port Hudson garrison were paroled, and officers sent to prison in New Orleans and later to Johnson's Island, Ohio, this account is likely not true. When White was paroled, he supposedly returned to the family plantation to find it abandoned, the canefields barren, and the place nearly empty of most of its former slaves.

The only documented evidence of White's Confederate service consists of an account of his capture on March 12, 1865, in an action in Morganza in Pointe Coupee Parish, which is contained in the Official Records of the American Civil War, and his service records in the National Archives, noting his subsequent imprisonment in New Orleans and parole in April 1865. These records confirm his service as a lieutenant in Captain W. B. Barrow's company of a Louisiana cavalry regiment, for all practical purposes a loosely organized band of irregulars or "scouts" (guerrillas). One organizing officer of this regiment, which was sometimes called "Barrow's Regiment" or the "9th Louisiana Cavalry Regiment," was Major Robert Pruyn. Pruyn (a postwar mayor of Baton Rouge, Louisiana) served as courier relaying messages from Port Hudson's commander, General Franklin Gardner, to General Joseph E. Johnston, crossing the Union siege lines by swimming the Mississippi. Pruyn escaped from Port Hudson prior to its surrender in the same manner. According to another account, after White was paroled in April 1865 and following the surrender of the western Confederate forces, he ended his military career by walking (his clothing in rags) to a comrade's family home in Livonia in Pointe Coupee Parish.

White's Civil War service was taken as a matter of common knowledge at the time of his initial nomination to the United States Supreme Court, and the Confederate Veteran periodical, published for the United Confederate Veterans, congratulated him upon his confirmation. White was one of three ex-Confederate soldiers to serve on the Supreme Court. The others were Associate Justices Lucius Quintus Cincinnatus Lamar of Mississippi and Horace Harmon Lurton of Tennessee. The Court's other ex-Confederate, Associate Justice Howell Edmunds Jackson, had held a civil position under the Confederate government.

White's membership in the Ku Klux Klan is a matter of contention. Some authors, such Michael Newton, claim White was a "Reconstruction Era Klansman." Other reports question whether there is enough evidence to support that claim, though noting that membership in secret societies such as the KKK can be difficult to document.

According to biographer Paul Finkelman:
Although the moviemaker D. W. Griffith claimed White endorsed his racist movie, The Birth of a Nation (1915), and asserted that White had been in the Ku Klux Klan, there is no evidence to support either of Griffith's contentions.

In 1877, White served on the Reception Committee of the Knights of Momus in New Orleans. The Knights' Mardi Gras parade was an attack on Reconstruction so extreme that it was widely condemned, and even denounced by the Krewe of Rex.

Political career

While living on his family's abandoned plantation, White began his legal studies. He enrolled at the University of Louisiana in New Orleans to complete his study of the law, at what is now known as the Tulane University Law School. He subsequently was admitted to the bar and commenced practice in New Orleans in 1868. He was also mentored as a young attorney by Edouard Bermudez, a New Orleans lawyer who later served as chief justice of the Louisiana Supreme Court.

White served in the Louisiana State Senate in 1874, a year marked by interracial violence in political campaigns and elections. He also served on the Louisiana Supreme Court from 1878 to 1880. In 1891, the State Legislature elected him to the United States Senate to succeed James B. Eustis. During his time in state politics, White was politically affiliated with two-time governor Francis T. Nicholls (1876–1880; 1888–1892), a former Confederate general. He was Nicholls' campaign manager in the 1888 Louisiana gubernatorial election, which was riddled with fraud and the intimidation of African American voters to ensure Nicholls' election.

United States Supreme Court

Associate justice
White was nominated by President Grover Cleveland to be an associate justice of the Supreme Court of the United States on February 19, 1894, after the Senate had rejected his first two nominees: William B. Hornblower and Wheeler Hazard Peckham. In contrast to those nominations, the Senate confirmed White the same day on a voice vote.  He took the judicial oath of office a few weeks later, March 12, 1894.

In 1896, White was a part of the 7–1 majority in Plessy v. Ferguson, which upheld the constitutionality of racial segregation laws for public facilities as long as the segregated facilities were equal in quality. He also participated in the Insular Cases of the early 20th century regarding the relationship of the United States to its territories acquired in the Spanish–American War, where he concurred with the 5–4 decision in Downes v. Bidwell (1901) that the newly-annexed territories were not properly part of the United States for purposes of the Constitution in several ways. However, wrote White, the constitutional guarantees of a citizen's rights of liberty and property were applicable to all and "cannot be under any circumstances transcended."

Chief justice

On December 12, 1910, President William Howard Taft nominated White to become Chief Justice of the United States, following the death of Melville Fuller. The appointment was unusual, as White was the first incumbent associate justice to be appointed as chief justice. (John Rutledge, a former associate justice, had been given a recess appointment as chief justice in 1795). The wisdom of elevating an associate justice to chief justice was questioned, as were Taft's motives for selecting White. Nonetheless, the Senate confirmed White the same day, and again on a voice vote. He became the nation's ninth chief justice on December 19, 1910.

White was generally seen as one of the more conservative members of the court. He originated the term "Rule of Reason." He also joined the Hammer v. Dagenhart decision, ruling that the federal government could not ban child labor. However, White also wrote the 1916 decision upholding the constitutionality of the Adamson Act, which mandated a maximum eight-hour work day for railroad employees.  White's background as a Democrat, Confederate veteran and Southern lawyer might have predicted legal positions that would have sought to curtail federal power. Yet, surprisingly, White articulated nationalist positions in his decisions, much like President Taft. He supported expanded regulation and taxation by Congress.  He was usually conservative in racial issues, as were most justices. However, he wrote the majority decisions in favor of civil rights in important cases. Late in life, he expressed sorrow at the entire Civil War experience and his role in it.

As chief justice at a time when the Court's work was carried out with more than 8,000 cases brought each year before the court, and only a few clerks to work for all the members of the Court, White held weekly meetings with fellow jurists, assigned all the cases and wrote the majority opinions in 711 cases, as well as 155 dissenting opinions, all opposing income taxes. He wrote for a unanimous Court in Guinn v. United States (1915), which invalidated the Oklahoma and Maryland grandfather clauses (and, by extension, those in other Southern states) as "repugnant to the Fifteenth Amendment and therefore null and void." Nevertheless, Southern states quickly devised other methods to continue their disfranchisement of blacks (and in some cases, many poor whites) that withstood Court scrutiny.

In 1918, the Selective Draft Law Cases upheld the Selective Service Act of 1917, and more generally, upheld conscription in the United States, which President Taft said was "one of his great opinions."

During his tenure as chief justice, White swore in presidents Woodrow Wilson (twice) and Warren G. Harding. At the time of his death on May 21, 1921, he had served on the Court for a total of  years,  of them as chief justice. He was succeeded by former president Taft, who had elevated White to the chief justice seat and had long desired the seat himself.

Personal life and death
White married Leita Montgomery Kent, the widow of Linden Kent, on November 6, 1894, in New York City.  His wife was the daughter of Romonzo and Virginia High Montgomery; White proposed to her before her first marriage but was turned down, and proposed again after her first husband died in 1892.

White's paternal ancestors were of Irish Catholic descent, and he was reared in that religion, a Roman Catholic his entire life.

White died on May 19, 1921, at the age of 75. He is buried at the Oak Hill Cemetery in Washington, D.C.

Legacy and honors
In 1914, he was awarded the Laetare Medal by the University of Notre Dame, the oldest and most prestigious award for American Catholics.
A statue of White is one of the two honoring Louisiana natives in the National Statuary Hall in the U.S. Capitol. 
A statue of White was located in front of the Louisiana Supreme Court building in New Orleans until it was removed in December 2020. The second statue was a local landmark on the New Orleans scene, created by Bryant Baker, who was selected for the commission by White's widow, and dedicated April 8, 1926.
In his honor, the Louisiana State University Law Center founded the annual Edward Douglass White Lectures. They have featured such distinguished speakers as Chief Justices Warren E. Burger and William H. Rehnquist.
The play, Father Chief Justice: Edward Douglass White and the Constitution by Paul Baier, a professor at LSU Law Center, was based on White's life.
In 1995, White was posthumously inducted into the Louisiana Political Museum and Hall of Fame in Winnfield.
Edward Douglass White Council #2473 of the Knights of Columbus in Arlington, Virginia, was named in his honor, but dropped the name in August 2020.
The Chief Justice White Council #2586 of the Knights of Columbus in Bogota, New Jersey, is also named in his honor.
Edward Douglas White Catholic High School in Thibodaux, Louisiana, was named for him.
During World War II the Liberty ship  was built in Brunswick, Georgia, and named in his honor.

See also

List of justices of the Supreme Court of the United States
List of United States Supreme Court justices by time in office
United States Supreme Court cases during the White Court

References

Notes

Citations

Sources
 Retrieved on 2009-04-11
"Chief Justice White Is Dead at Age 75 After an Operation." The New York Times. May 19, 1921
Floyd, William Barrow, The Barrow Family of Old Louisiana, (Transylvania Printing Co., Lexington, Ky., 1963)
Highsaw, Robert B. (1981) Edward Douglass White: Defender of the Conservative Faith, Baton Rouge, LA: Louisiana State University Press, 1ISBN 0807124281.
 Kent, Andrew. "The Rebel Soldier Who Became Chief Justice of the United States: The Civil War and its Legacy for Edward Douglass White of Louisiana." American Journal of Legal History (2016) 56#2 pp 209–264.
Klinkhammer, Marie. (1943) Edward Douglass White, Chief Justice of the United States. Washington, D.C.: Catholic University of America Press.
Pratt, Walter F. (1999) The Supreme Court Under Edward Douglass White, 1910–1921. Columbia, SC: University of South Carolina Press. .
Reeves, William D.,  Paths to Distinction: Dr. James White, Governor E.D. White and Chief Justice Edward Douglass White of Louisiana. Thibodaux, La., 1999: Friends of the Edward Douglass White Historic Site. .

Further reading

*The White Court, 1910-1921, History of the Court, Supreme Court Historical Society.
 Finkelman, Paul. "White, Edward Douglass"; American National Biography Online Feb. 2000.  Access Oct 05 2016  

Mele, Joseph C. (Fall 1962) Edward Douglass White's Influence on the Louisiana Anti-Lottery Movement. Southern Speech Journal 28: 36-43.
Reeves, William Dale. (1999) Paths to distinction: Dr. James White, Governor E.D. White, and Chief Justice Edward Douglass White of Louisiana. Friends of the Edward Douglass White Historic Site. 

U.S. Supreme Court. (1921) Proceedings of the Bar and Officers of the Supreme Court of the United States in Memory of Edward Douglass White, December 17, 1921. Washington: Government Printing Office.

External links

Ariens, Michael, Edward Douglass White.
Bust of Edward Douglass White, Oyez. official Supreme Court media.
The E. D. White Historic Site, including the original plantation home, operated by the Louisiana State Museum
Edward Douglas White, official Supreme Court media, Oyez.

|-

|-

|-

1845 births
1921 deaths
19th-century American judges
20th-century American judges
American Civil War prisoners of war
American people of English descent
Burials at Oak Hill Cemetery (Washington, D.C.)
Catholics from Louisiana
Chief justices of the United States
Confederate States Army officers
Conservatism in the United States
Democratic Party United States senators from Louisiana
Georgetown University alumni
Justices of the Supreme Court of the United States
Laetare Medal recipients
Lawyers from New Orleans
Lee family of Virginia
Democratic Party Louisiana state senators
Justices of the Louisiana Supreme Court
People from Thibodaux, Louisiana
People of Louisiana in the American Civil War
Philodemic Society members
Politicians from New Orleans
Tulane University Law School alumni
United States federal judges appointed by Grover Cleveland
United States federal judges appointed by William Howard Taft